[[Image:Neradnik01.jpg|thumb|Cover of Neradniks first issue from January 2005.]]Neradnik (literally: Non-worker''''') is countercultural youth fanzine from the south Belgrade suburbs, Serbia.

References

External links 
 Neradnik

2005 establishments in Serbia
Counterculture
Cultural magazines
Fanzines
Mass media in Belgrade
Magazines published in Serbia
Serbian-language magazines
Magazines established in 2005